Nebria zioni is a species of brownish-black coloured ground beetle in the Nebriinae subfamily that is endemic to Utah, United States.

References

zioni
Beetles described in 1943
Beetles of North America
Endemic fauna of Utah